Mikheil Kavelashvili (born 22 July 1971) is a Georgian politician and former professional footballer. He is the co-founder of People's Power party.

As a player he was a striker who notably played in the Premier League for Manchester City and in the Swiss Super League for Grasshoppers, Zürich, Luzern, Sion, Aarau and Basel. He also played for Dinamo Tbilisi and Spartak Vladikavkaz. He was capped 46 times by Georgia, scoring nine goals.

He moved into Politics in 2016 was elected to the Parliament of Georgia in the Georgian Dream party before leaving to co-found the People's Power party.

Club career
As with many leading Georgian players, Kavelashvili began his career with FC Dinamo Tbilisi, emerging from their youth system in 1989. A skilful striker, he soon established himself in the Dinamo side before earning a move to Russian club FC Spartak Vladikavkaz in 1995.

He began training with Manchester City F.C. on 1 March 1996  before finally joining the club on transfer deadline day. He made his city debut on 6 April scoring in the derby game against Manchester United F.C. Following City's relegation, he played 24 games (2 goals) in the Football League First Division. The number was not enough to secure a renewal of his work permit and so he was sent out on loan to Grasshopper Club Zürich, winning a Swiss Super League in 1998. He has since played the majority of his football in Switzerland, featuring for Fussballclub Zürich, FC Lucerne, FC Sion and FC Aarau. Aarau loaned him out to Vladikavkaz in Autumn 2004, but he returned to Switzerland after playing just seven games.

Kavelashvili joined FC Basel's first team during their 2005–06 season under head coach Christian Gross, who was in his seventh season with the club in that position. Gross had been head coach for GC as Kavelashvili had won the Swiss championship in the 1997–98 season. Kavelashvili played his domestic league debut for the club in the home game in the St. Jakob-Park on 12 March 2006 as he was substituted in the 66th minute. He also scored his first goal for the team during the same game, it was the match winning goal as Basel won 1–0 against Grasshopper Club. Basel had started the season well and were joint leaders of the championship with Zürich right until the last day of the league campaign. On the final day of the league season FCB played at home against FCZ. A last-minute goal from Zürich's Iulian Filipescu meant the final score was 1-2 in favour of the away team and it gave FCZ their first national championship since 1980–81. The title for Basel was lost on goal difference.

Kavelashvili had 10 appearances for FCB in his first season and in each he had been used as a substitute. In his second season he also made 7 appearances, again each as substitute, but the club released him before the winter break, and he retired from his active football career. During his period with the club, he played a total of 26 games for Basel scoring a total of 12 goals. 14 of these games were in the Swiss Super League, three in the UEFA Cup and nine were friendly games. He scored four goals in the domestic league and the other eight during the test games.

International career
With his national team he won Malta International Football Tournament 1998

Political career
In 2016 he was elected as a member of Parliament of Georgia from the Georgian Dream party. He left Georgian Dream in 2022 and co-founded the People's Power party.

Honours

Dinamo Tbilisi
 Umaglesi Liga champion: 1990, 1994, 1995.

Vladikavkaz
 Russian Premier League champion: 1995.

Grasshoppers
 Swiss Super League: 1998.

References

External links

Footballers from Tbilisi
Premier League players
FC Basel players
Association football forwards
Soviet footballers
Footballers from Georgia (country)
FC Spartak Vladikavkaz players
Grasshopper Club Zürich players
Manchester City F.C. players
FC Zürich players
FC Dinamo Tbilisi players
Russian Premier League players
Georgia (country) international footballers
FC Luzern players
FC Aarau players
FC Sion players
Expatriate footballers in Russia
Expatriate footballers in Switzerland
Expatriate footballers in England
Expatriate footballers from Georgia (country)
1971 births
Living people
Swiss Super League players
Politicians from Georgia (country)
Members of the Parliament of Georgia
Georgian Dream politicians